What About Brian? is an American comedy-drama television series created by Dana Stevens and co-produced by J. J. Abrams' company Bad Robot Productions. The series premiered on April 16, 2006, on ABC, as a mid-season replacement and concluded on March 26, 2007. On May 16, 2006, ABC renewed the series for its second and final season, notably making it the only new series to be picked up by the network from the 2005–2006 television season, despite it being the final new series introduced by ABC during the season. The series returned October 9, 2006, with a full 22-episode season confirmed by November 10, 2006. The second season order was subsequently scaled back to 19 episodes by the network.

What About Brian? ended its run after two seasons on March 26, 2007.

Plot 
32-year-old Brian Davis is living alone in Venice Beach, California. However, he is the only bachelor left in his group of friends. His best friend, lawyer Adam Hillman, recently got engaged to his long-time girlfriend Marjorie, a girl Brian is secretly in love with and whom Adam was planning to break up with prior to their engagement. Another friend, Dave Greco, who is co-founder with Brian of Zap Monkey, a company that designs and produces video games, cannot wait to welcome Brian into the marriage club, as Dave has been married to Deena for thirteen years and has three daughters. His older sister, record executive Nicole, has recently married Italian model Angelo Varzi and is pregnant with a girl she names Bella. Brian's journey to find romance leads him down a road where the picture-perfect relationships of his friends are tested and revealed for what they truly are.

Cast and characters 
 Barry Watson as Brian Davis
 Matthew Davis as Adam Hillman
 Rick Gomez as Dave Greco
 Amanda Detmer as Deena Greco
 Rosanna Arquette as Nicole Varzi
 Sarah Lancaster as Marjorie Seaver (Episodes 1–6, 17–19) (note: portrayed by Polly Shannon in the unaired pilot)
 Raoul Bova as Angelo Varzi (Episodes 1–6, 10)
 Rachelle Lefevre as Heather "Summer" Hillman (Episodes 5, 7–19)
 Jason George as Jimmy (Season 2)
 Amanda Foreman as Ivy (Season 2)
 Krista Allen as Bridget Keller (Episodes 12–22)
 Stacy Keibler as Stephanie (Episodes 20–25)
 Jessica Szohr as Laura (Episodes 20–25)
 Tiffani Thiessen as Natasha Drew (Episodes 21–25)
 Amy Jo Johnson as Karen "The Car Girl" (Episodes 1, 10–11)
 Jon Hamm as Richard Povich (Episodes 2–5, 23–24)
Malena Maestas as Baby Girl (Episode 24)
Anaisa Maestas as Baby Girl (Episode 24)
 William Devane as Michael Davis (Episodes 10-16)

Episodes 

Notes

Season 1 (2006)

Season 2 (2006–07) 
The second season of the series premiered on October 9, 2006. Along with Wife Swap and The Bachelor, it was part of ABC's first primetime Monday evening lineup for the fall not to include Monday Night Football, since that show's shift to ESPN. Contrasting with what had historically been a night which drew high male viewership, What About Brian? was seen by some industry analysts as the closer to a new lineup appealing particularly to female viewers. Every episode in the second season begins with "What About...?".

Unaired pilot 

An unaired pilot with a completely different structure from the first episode was created, with Polly Shannon portraying Marjorie instead of Sarah Lancaster.

International broadcasts

Home media
Walt Disney Studios Home Entertainment has released the entire series on DVD in Region 1.

Music 
 Howie Day's "Collide" is the song used in the announcement commercials.
 The theme song that appears at the beginning of each episode is "Calling All Friends" by Low Stars.
 The 1970 song "Hey Hey What Can I Do?" by Led Zeppelin inspired the theme song and also has lyrics that parallel the show's plot. The lyrics of the song tell of a man's love for a woman that he will never have all to himself; a woman who 'wants to ball all day', 'stays drunk all the time', and who 'won't be true.' The first verse is a declaration of his love and his desire to tell her that she is the only one for him. The second verse describes her infidelity and his jealousy and frustration. In the third verse he comes to the conclusion that he must leave her 'where the guitars play', a sentiment reinforced by the vamp in which the lead singer, Robert Plant, is backed by the rest of the band repeating the two lines; 'Hey hey what can I do' and 'Oh Lord what can I say.'
 Colin Hay's music has been used in several episodes of What About Brian?:
 Hay's song "Waiting for My Real Life to Begin?" ended the episode "Two in 24" and was also used in the episode "Sex, Lies and Videotape."
 "Beautiful World" ended the episode "Moving Day."
 "Don't Wait Up" ended the episode "The Importance of Being Brian" and was also in the episode "Sex, Lies and Videotape."
Keith Varon has provided songs for the show.

References

External links 
 

2000s American comedy-drama television series
American Broadcasting Company original programming
2006 American television series debuts
2007 American television series endings
Television series by ABC Studios
Television shows set in Los Angeles
Television series by Bad Robot Productions